Brule Lake, Brûlé Lake or Lac Brûlé may refer to:

Canada
 Brûlé Lake (Alberta)
 Brule Lake (Frontenac County), one of nine lakes with this name in Ontario
 Brûlé Lake (Stewart Township), one of nine lakes with this name in Ontario
 Brûlé Lake (Romaine), a lake on the Romaine River in Quebec
 Brûlé Lake (Lac-Jacques-Cartier), in Lac-Jacques-Cartier, La Côte-de-Beaupré Regional County Municipality, Capitale-Nationale, Quebec

United States
 Brule Lake (Michigan-Wisconsin), on the Michigan/Wisconsin border
 Brule Lake (Minnesota)